Kurt Herlth (1896–1966) was a German art director known for his designs of film sets. His brother Robert Herlth was also an art director active in the German film industry, and the two men worked together a number of times.

Selected filmography
 My Heart Calls You (1934)
 My Heart Is Calling You (1934)
 Victoria (1935)
 The Emperor's Candlesticks (1936)
 Court Theatre (1936)
 Capers (1937)
 Ride to Freedom (1937)
 Serenade (1937)
 A Mother's Love (1939)
 I Am Sebastian Ott (1939)
 Andreas Schlüter (1942)
 Destiny (1942)
 Melusine (1944)
 Marriage in the Shadows (1947)
 No Place for Love (1947)
 The Adventures of Fridolin (1948)
 Artists' Blood (1949)
 Don't Dream, Annette (1949)
 The Murder Trial of Doctor Jordan (1949)
 The Merry Wives of Windsor (1950)
 The White Horse Inn (1952)
 The Sergeant's Daughter (1952)
 The Empress of China (1953)
 Hit Parade (1953)
 As Long as There Are Pretty Girls (1955)
 Regine (1956)
 And Lead Us Not Into Temptation (1957)

References

Bibliography
 Bock, Hans-Michael & Bergfelder, Tim. The Concise CineGraph. Encyclopedia of German Cinema. Berghahn Books, 2009.

External links

1896 births
1966 deaths
People from Wriezen
People from the Province of Brandenburg
German art directors